The Asia/Oceania Zone was the unique zone within Group 4 of the regional Davis Cup competition in 2022. The zone's competition was held in round robin format in Colombo, Sri Lanka, from 8 to 13 August 2022 and in Isa Town, Bahrain, from 17 to 22 October 2022.

Participating nations

Withdrawn/inactive nations

Draw
Date: 8–13 August 2022 and 17–22 October 2022

Location: Sri Lanka Tennis Association Courts, Colombo, Sri Lanka (clay) and Bahrain Tennis Federation, Isa Town, Bahrain (hard)

Format: Round-robin basis. In Colombo, one pool of three teams and one pool of four teams. The winners of each pool will play-off against each other to determine the nation promoted to Asia/Oceania Group III in 2023. In Isa Town, two pools of five teams. The winners of each pool will play-off against each other to determine the nation promoted to Asia/Oceania Group III in 2023.

Seeding

Colombo

 1Davis Cup Rankings as of 7 March 2022

Isa Town

 1Davis Cup Rankings as of 20 September 2022

Round Robin

Pool A (Colombo)

Pool B (Colombo)

Pool A (Isa Town)

Pool B (Isa Town)

Standings are determined by: 1. number of wins; 2. number of matches; 3. in two-team ties, head-to-head records; 4. in three-team ties, (a) percentage of sets won (head-to-head records if two teams remain tied), then (b) percentage of games won (head-to-head records if two teams remain tied), then (c) Davis Cup rankings.

Playoffs

Round Robin

Pool A (Colombo)

Sri Lanka vs. Bangladesh

Kyrgyzstan vs. Bangladesh

Sri Lanka vs. Kyrgyzstan

Pool B (Colombo)

Iraq vs. Brunei

Yemen vs. Maldives

Iraq vs. Maldives

Yemen vs. Brunei

Iraq vs. Yemen

Maldives vs. Brunei

Pool A (Isa Town)

Cambodia vs. Bhutan

Turkmenistan vs. Bhutan

Cambodia vs. Mongolia

Turkmenistan vs. Mongolia

Turkmenistan vs. Cambodia

Mongolia vs. Bhutan

Pool B (Isa Town)

Kuwait vs. Guam

Bahrain vs. Singapore

Kuwait vs. Laos

Bahrain vs. Guam

Kuwait vs. Singapore

Guam vs. Laos

Kuwait vs. Bahrain

Singapore vs. Laos

Bahrain vs. Laos

Guam vs. Singapore

Play-offs

Promotion play-off

Sri Lanka vs. Iraq

Cambodia vs. Singapore

3rd place play-off

Kyrgyzstan vs. Brunei

Turkmenistan vs. Kuwait

5th place play-off

Bangladesh vs. Yemen

Bhutan vs. Guam

7th place play-off

Mongolia vs. Laos

References

External links
Official Website

Davis Cup Asia/Oceania Zone
Asia/Oceania Zone